HMS H8 was a British H-class submarine built by the Canadian Vickers Co., Montreal. She was laid down on 19 May 1915 and commissioned in June 1915.
Like other Canadian-built submarines, she was sailed across the Atlantic for service in the North Sea and as recognition of this she initially remained under the command of her Canadian captain, Lieutenant-Commander B. L. Johnson, R.N.R. with a largely reserve crew. HMS H8 was sold on 29 November 1921 in Arbroath.

Design

H8 was fitted with a  Hotchkiss quick-firing gun (6-pounder) and four  torpedo tubes. Its torpedo tubes were fitted to the bows and the submarine was loaded with eight  torpedoes. It is a Holland 602 type submarine but was designed to meet Royal Navy specifications. Its complement was twenty-two crew members.

References

Bibliography

External links
 Crew of H8

 

British H-class submarines
Ships built in Quebec
1915 ships
World War I submarines of the United Kingdom
Royal Navy ship names